Cranberry (also Cranberry Village, Salina) is an unincorporated community in Cranberry Township, Venango County, Pennsylvania, United States.

Notes

Unincorporated communities in Venango County, Pennsylvania
Unincorporated communities in Pennsylvania